In mathematics, System T can refer to:
 A theory of arithmetic in all finite types used in Gödel's Dialectica interpretation
 An axiom system of modal logic